Le Manais, a château at Ferrières-en-Bray near Gournay-en-Bray in Normandy, built in 1730, was a three-story building in extensive farmlands.

In the late 1940s, Le Manais was the home of the Count and Countess Du Plessix.

References

External links
Photographs of Le Manais 

Châteaux in Seine-Maritime